The Ilfov (not to be confused with the Ilfovăț) is a left tributary of the river Dâmbovița in Romania. The river has given its name to Ilfov County. Its source is in the hills west of Târgoviște. It flows through the villages Udrești, Bungetu, Ilfoveni, Mircea Vodă, Heleșteu, Răcari and Bâldana. It discharges into the Dâmbovița near Bâcu.

References

Rivers of Romania
Rivers of Dâmbovița County
Rivers of Ilfov County